Heritiera percoriacea is a species of flowering plant in the family Malvaceae (or Sterculiaceae). It is found only in Java, Indonesia. It is threatened by habitat loss.

References

percoriacea
Endemic flora of Java
Endangered plants
Taxonomy articles created by Polbot